Chaifetz is a surname. Notable people with the surname include:

Jill Chaifetz (1964–2006), American lawyer and children's rights advocate
Richard Chaifetz (born 1953), American billionaire businessman, investor, licensed neuropsychologist, and philanthropist

See also
 Chaffetz